Kivie Kaplan (April 1, 1904 – May 5, 1975) was an American businessman and philanthropist. He served as president of the National Association for the Advancement of Colored People (NAACP) from 1966 until his death.

Kivie Kaplan was born in Boston, Massachusetts, the youngest of three sons of Benjamin and Celia Kaplan, Lithuanian Jewish immigrants. In 1924, he and his brothers, Joseph and Archie, took over their father's leather business; he helped run the tanneries until 1962, when he retired to devote his time to philanthropic work. In 1925, Kivie Kaplan married Emily Rogers, whom he was married to until his death. They had three children, Sylvia, Jean, and Edward.

Kaplan joined the National Association for the Advancement of Colored People (NAACP) in 1932 and was elected to the National Board in 1954. In 1966, he was elected its President and held that post until his death. As president, Kaplan spoke throughout the United States on the organization's behalf and sought financial contributions. Kaplan was a trustee of two black colleges, Lincoln University and Tougaloo College, and treasurer of The Crisis magazine.

Kaplan was also involved in Jewish affairs and was a member of the Board of Trustees of the Union of American Hebrew Congregations. He contributed substantial sums of money to the Jewish Memorial Hospital in Boston and Brandeis University. He received numerous awards and honorary degrees, including the Amistad Award of the American Missionary Association and honorary degrees from Wilberforce University, Hebrew Union College, and Lincoln University.

He and his wife Emily fought in support of civil rights for all. He was one in a long line of American Jews who held a leadership role in African American civil rights groups.

References

Bibliography 
S. Norman Feingold and William B. Silverman, Kivie Kaplan: A Legend in His Own Time, Union of American Hebrew Congregations, 1976, .

External links 
Kivie Kaplan Papers (includes brief biography)

1904 births
1975 deaths
Businesspeople from Boston
Jewish American philanthropists
American people of Lithuanian-Jewish descent
Philanthropists from Massachusetts
NAACP activists
20th-century American businesspeople
20th-century American philanthropists
20th-century American Jews